Rudolph Toombs (1914 – November 28, 1962) was an American performer and songwriter. He wrote "Teardrops from My Eyes", Ruth Brown's first number one R&B song, and other hit songs for her, including "5-10-15 Hours". He also wrote "One Mint Julep" for The Clovers.

History
Toombs was born in Monroe, Louisiana. He began as a vaudeville-style song-and-dance man and later became a productive lyricist and composer of doo-wop songs and rhythm-and-blues standards in the 1950s and 1960s. Some of his work was done at Atlantic Records, writing and arranging songs for Ahmet Ertegun. Toombs was murdered by robbers in the hallway of his apartment house in Harlem in 1962.

Ruth Brown credited Toombs as a major reason for her success. She describes him as joyful, exuberant man, so full of life that he passed that ebullience on to her. He taught her how to take a moody blues ballad and make it into a bouncy jump blues.

Songs
Some of Toombs best known songs are listed below.
 "Teardrops from My Eyes", a hit for Ruth Brown
 "One Mint Julep", sung by the Clovers (number 1 R&B in 1951) covered in an instrumental version by Ray Charles (R&B number 1, Billboard Hot 100 number 8 in 1961)
 "5-10-15 Hours", sung by Ruth Brown (number 1 R&B in 1951) 
 "One Scotch, One Bourbon, One Beer", recorded and released in 1953 by Amos Milburn. 
 "Thinking and Drinking"
 "Gum Drop", a hit for Otis Williams, covered by the Crew-Cuts, in 1955
 "I'm Shakin'", a hit for Little Willie John in 1960, covered by the Blasters in 1981, Long John Baldry in 1996, Jack White in 2012, and Willy Moon in 2013
 "That's Your Mistake", performed by Otis Williams in 1955, covered by the Crew Cuts
 "Lonesome Whistle Blues", covered by Freddie King in 1961 and by Chicken Shack in 1968
 "I Cried and Cried"  
 "I Get a Thrill"
 "It Hurts to Be in Love", co-written with Julius Dixson for Annie Laurie (1957)

Artists
His songs (apart from those recordings listed above) have been sung by the following artists:
Amos Milburn
Hank Ballard
Freddie King
Ella Mae Morse
Otis Williams and the Charms
The Orioles
James Brown
Big Joe Turner
Louis Jordan
Pat Boone
Wynonie Harris
Hank Snow
Johnny "Guitar" Watson
Betty Everett
Frankie Laine
The Five Keys
Albert King
Bill Haley & His Comets
Chicken Shack
The Blasters
Jack White
The Honeydrippers

References

External links
Rudy Toombs Biography
Mini biography

Songwriters from Louisiana
1914 births
1962 deaths
1962 murders in the United States
Vaudeville performers
Musicians from Monroe, Louisiana
American murder victims
People murdered in New York City
Male murder victims
20th-century American musicians
American blues singers
Jump blues musicians
Murdered African-American people
20th-century African-American musicians